LaFayette is a city in, and the county seat of, Walker County, Georgia, United States. As of the 2020 census, the city population was 6,888. It was founded as Chattooga.

LaFayette is part of the Chattanooga, TN-GA Metropolitan Statistical Area.

History
LaFayette was founded as Chattooga, in 1835, as the seat of newly formed Walker County.  The county was named after the former United States senator Freeman Walker. Chattooga was renamed LaFayette in 1836 after Gilbert du Motier, Marquis de Lafayette, the French aristocrat who fought in the American Revolutionary War.

Geography
LaFayette is located at  (34.709704, -85.283862).

Demographics

2020 census

As of the 2020 United States census, there were 6,888 people, 2,847 households, and 1,844 families residing in the city.

2010 census
As of the census of 2010, there were 7,121 people, 2,712 households, and 1,749 families residing in the city. The racial makeup of the city was 88.6% White, 7.5% African American, 0.04% Native American, 0.9% Asian, 0.01% Pacific Islander, 0.76% from other races, and 0.93% from two or more races. Hispanic or Latino of any race were 1.07% of the population.

There were 2,712 households, out of which 28.9% had children under the age of 18 living with them, 42.9% were married couples living together, 17.1% had a female householder with no husband present, and 35.7% were non-families. 32.6% of all households were made up of individuals, and 17.1% had someone living alone who was 65 years of age or older.  The average household size was 2.33 and the average family size was 2.94.

In the city, the population was spread out, with 24.1% under the age of 18, 9.8% from 18 to 24, 25.4% from 25 to 44, 21.6% from 45 to 64, and 19.2% who were 65 years of age or older.  The median age was 38 years. For every 100 females, there were 83.5 males.  For every 100 females age 18 and over, there were 80.2 males.

The median income for a household in the city was $23,093, and the median income for a family was $29,387. Males had a median income of $27,528 versus $20,906 for females. The per capita income for the city was $15,318.  About 16.0% of families and 27.2% of the population were below the poverty line, including 33.4% of those under age 18 and 15.7% of those age 65 or over.

Notable people

 Andy Bean, golfer, repeat winner on both the PGA Tour and Champions Tour
 Ronald H. Griffith, United States Army General, former Vice Chief of Staff of the United States Army
 Zahra Karinshak, Georgia State Senator, attorney, and Air Force veteran

References

External links

 City of LaFayette
 catwalkchatt.com The website for the Walker County Messenger, the county newspaper since 1877.
 WQCH Radio

Cities in Georgia (U.S. state)
Cities in Walker County, Georgia
County seats in Georgia (U.S. state)
Cities in the Chattanooga metropolitan area
Chattanooga metropolitan area county seats